Dominique Johanna Anna Janssen (formerly Bloodworth, born 17 January 1995) is a Dutch professional footballer who plays as a defender for German Frauen-Bundesliga club VfL Wolfsburg and the Netherlands national team.

Club career
Janssen played in the B-Youth team for her first club, RKSV Wittenhorst. In the summer of 2013, she joined SGS Essen of the German Bundesliga. In linking up with Essen she turned down offers from teams PSV/FC Eindhoven and AFC Ajax of the BeNe League. On 8 September 2013 (1st Round), she made her club debut in a 3–3 draw vs BV Cloppenburg in the Bundesliga. She scored her first goal in an Essen jersey on 3 November 2013 (7th Round) in the 5–1 win against Hoffenheim.  In 2015, the Dutchwoman signed for English side Arsenal Ladies. This move proved to be fruitful for her with Janssen winning the WSL Cup of 2015 in a 3–0 beating of Notts County by Arsenal.

She once again played in another Cup final the following season, this being the 2016 FA Cup final which took place on 14 May. Arsenal beat Chelsea by 1 goal to nil in the match at Wembley  and were thus crowned champions, earning their fourteenth FA Cup title.

Following the 2018–19 WSL season and 100 club appearances for Arsenal, Janssen signed with German Champions Wolfsburg.

International career

Janssen played for the first time for a Junior selection of Royal Dutch Football Association on 17 March 2010 at the friendly match of U-15 national team against England. In 2012, she was captain of the Dutch U-17 team in the qualifying matches for the 2012 UEFA Women's Under-17 Championship and also led the team, as captain, in qualifying for the 2013 UEFA Women's Under-19 Championship. In 2014, she succeeded with her team to qualify for the final round the 2014 UEFA Women's Under-19 Championship in Norway, where Netherlands won the title for the first time with 1–0 victory against Spain. Janssen played all five matches in the tournament.

In 2014, she was called for the senior team for the first time, taking part in the Netherlands squad for the 2014 Cyprus Cup. On 5 March 2014 she made her debut, when she came off the bench in the 65th minute at 2–2 against Australia.

Janssen was also part of the Dutch teams of the 2015 FIFA Women's World Cup and the winning team of the UEFA Women's Euro 2017. After the 2017 tournament the whole team was honoured by the Prime Minister Mark Rutte and Minister of Sport Edith Schippers and made Knights of the Order of Orange-Nassau.

In 2019 she was named to the squad for the 2019 FIFA Women's World Cup. The Netherlands won every match of the group stage and reached the final, where they lost to the United States.

International goals
Scores and results list the Netherlands goal tally first.

Personal life
In 2018, Janssen married American Brandon Bloodworth and adopted his name. Bloodworth is a US Air Force veteran and met Janssen in London, England. He was an NCAA Division 1 track and field sprinter from California. He now plays American Football for the Wolfsburg Blue Wings as a running back.

In 2020, Janssen announced that she and Bloodworth had decided to split up and she reverted to using her maiden name.

Honours

Club
Arsenal
FA Women's Cup: 2015–16
FA WSL Cup: 2015, 2017–18
FA Women's Super League: 2018–19

VfL Wolfsburg
Frauen Bundesliga: 2019-20, 2021-22,
DFB Pokal: 2019-20, 2020-21, 2021-22

International
Netherlands U19
UEFA Women's Under-19 Championship: 2014

Netherlands
UEFA Women's Euro: 2017
Algarve Cup: 2018

References

External links

 
 Dominique Janssen at onsorange.nl 
 Profile at vrouwenvoetbalnederland.nl 
 
 
 

Living people
1995 births
People from Horst aan de Maas
Dutch women's footballers
Netherlands women's international footballers
Women's association football defenders
2015 FIFA Women's World Cup players
SGS Essen players
VfL Wolfsburg (women) players
Expatriate women's footballers in Germany
Arsenal W.F.C. players
Expatriate women's footballers in England
Women's Super League players
Dutch expatriate sportspeople in Germany
Dutch expatriate sportspeople in England
UEFA Women's Championship-winning players
Knights of the Order of Orange-Nassau
Frauen-Bundesliga players
2019 FIFA Women's World Cup players
Dutch expatriate women's footballers
Footballers at the 2020 Summer Olympics
Olympic footballers of the Netherlands
UEFA Women's Euro 2022 players
Footballers from Limburg (Netherlands)
UEFA Women's Euro 2017 players